Mothball Mint is a solo CD by Kevin Hearn, keyboardist of Barenaked Ladies. This album was produced by Michael Phillip Wojewoda and released in 1997.

Kevin is accompanied on the album by many Toronto-area musicians who were friends of his, including all of the original members of his then-future band, Thin Buckle. One solo track originates from the Chicago Barenaked Ladies show from which the Rock Spectacle album was recorded. The rest of the album was recorded in a studio. All of the studio tracks feature Bob Scott on drums. Bass duties on the album are split between Barenaked Ladies colleague Jim Creeggan, and Chris Gartner. Martin Tielli and Derek Orford each play guitar on several tracks. Various other musicians contribute to the album.

Kevin still plays several songs off the album regularly (and some occasionally) when he plays with Thin Buckle.

Track listing

Personnel
Kevin Hearn - Vocals, guitar, piano, banjo, melodica, accordion, organ, samples
Bob Scott - Drums, milk jug, train
Jim Creeggan - Bass, vocals
Andy Creeggan - Percussion, vocals
Michael Johnson - Trumpet
James M. Stager - Trombone
Michael Phillip Wojewoda - Vocals, tambourine
Martin Tielli - Guitar
Derek Orford - Guitar
Sean Cullen - Vocals, evil hag of the shack
Don Garbutt - Arp whistle, vocal processing, programming, accordion, technos acxel
Chris Gartner - Bass
Anthony Brown - Vocals
Julie Stewart - Vocals

Production
Producers: Michael Phillip Wojewoda
Assistance: James Paul, Jessica Grant, Tom Heron
Engineer: Jono Grant, Don Garbutt
Mastering: Joao Carvalho
Photography: Harland Williams, Wayne Parent, John Williams, Kevin Hearn
Designer: Graphicjam Digital Arts

1997 albums
Kevin Hearn and Thin Buckle albums
Albums produced by Michael Phillip Wojewoda